Mansarovar Ground or Jaipur District Cricket Association Ground or KL Saini Ground is situated in Mansarovar area of Jaipur, Rajasthan It is the home ground of the Rajasthan cricket team. It has a capacity of 5,000 people and was opened in 1990.

References

External links
 espncricinfo
 cricketarchive
 wikimapia

Multi-purpose stadiums in India
Cricket grounds in Rajasthan
Sports venues in Jaipur
1990 establishments in Rajasthan
Sports venues completed in 1990
20th-century architecture in India